The U.S. Highway 66 Association was organized in Tulsa, Oklahoma in 1927.  Its purpose was to get U.S. Highway 66 paved from end to end and to promote tourism on the highway.

The organization was similar to many that existed before the creation of federal highways in 1926, including those that promoted the Lincoln Highway and the National Old Trails Highway.

John T. Woodruff of Springfield, Missouri was elected the first president. The association began to advertise the highway in magazines, on billboards, and brochures.  The continued push to completely pave the highway and complete an unfinished section (Watson Road in St. Louis, Missouri) paid off, the road was fully paved and completed in 1938, including a cut-off across New Mexico, bypassing a loop through Santa Fe.

The U.S. Highway 66 Association curtailed activities when World War II rationing of rubber and fuel disrupted leisure travel. In 1947, Jack and Gladys Cutberth revived the organization in Clinton, Oklahoma to promote "the shortest, fastest year-round best across the scenic West" with "800 miles of 4-lane highway".

In 1955, construction began on the new Interstate Highway System.  As these new interstates began to replace longer and longer sections of the old highway, the group in 1970 changed its name to the Main Street of America Association and continued to stand as a voice for the older highway. The association published its last brochure in 1974; the brochure's cover referenced the new interstate highways that would lead to its demise.

In 1976, the association disbanded as U.S. Route 66 was now largely concurrent with I-55, I-44, I-40, I-15, and I-10.  In 1984, the last section through Williams, Arizona was bypassed and in 1985 Route 66 was formally decommissioned.

The former association is not officially connected with the various Route 66 Associations which currently exist in all eight US Route 66 states to preserve and promote the historic highway; the first of these was established in 1987 by Angel Delgadillo and fifteen businesspeople in Seligman, Arizona to obtain "Historic Route 66" signage" on the old highway.

References 

U.S. Route 66
1927 establishments in Oklahoma
1976 disestablishments in the United States